State leaders in the 3rd century BC – State leaders in the 1st century BC – State leaders by year
This is a list of state leaders in the 2nd century BC (200–101 BC).

Africa

Africa: Northcentral

Libya

Cyrene (complete list) –
Ptolemy Apion, King (c.147–96 BC)

Africa: Northeast

Egypt

Ptolemaic Kingdom of Egypt (complete list) –
Ptolemy V Epiphanes, Pharaoh (204–181 BC)
Cleopatra I Syra, Regent (187–176 BC)
Ptolemy VI Philometor, Pharaoh (181–164, 163–145 BC)
Ptolemy VII Neos Philopator, Pharaoh (169–164, 144–132/131, 126–116 BC)
Cleopatra II, Queen (175–164 BC, 163–127, 124–116 BC)
Ptolemy VIII Physcon, Pharaoh (169–164 BC, 144–132/131 BC, 126–116 BC) 
Cleopatra III, Queen (142–131 BC, 127–101 BC)
Ptolemy IX Lathyros, Pharaoh (116–110 BC, 110–109 BC, 88–81 BC) 
Ptolemy X Alexander I, Pharaoh (110–109 BC, 107–88 BC)
Berenice III, Pharaoh (101–88 BC, 81–80 BC)

Nubia

Kingdom of Kush (complete list) –
Arqamani, Qore (3rd–2nd century BC)
Adikhalamani, Qore (early 2nd century BC)
Shanakdakhete, Kandake (late 2nd century BC)
Tanyidamani, Qore (2nd–1st century BC)

Africa: Northwest

Algeria

Numidia (complete list) –
Vermina, King (202 BC–?)
Archobarzane, King (?)
Massinissa, King (202–148 BC)
Micipsa, King (148–118 BC)
Adherbal, King (118–117, 117–112 BC)
Hiempsal I, King (117 BC)
Jugurtha, King (117–105 BC)
Gauda, King (105–88 BC)

Morocco

Mauretania (complete list) –
Bocchus I, King (c.110–c.80s BC)

Asia

Asia: East

China

Western Han, China (complete list) –
Gaozu, Emperor (202–195 BC)
Hui, Emperor (195–188 BC)
Qianshao, Emperor (188–184 BC)
Houshao, Emperor (184–180 BC)
Wen, Emperor (180–157 BC)
Jing, Emperor (157–141 BC)
Wu, Emperor (141–87 BC)

Asia: Southeast
Vietnam
Triệu dynasty (complete list) –
Zhao Tuo, King (203–137 BC)
Zhao Mo, King (137–122 BC)
Zhao Yingqi, King (122–115 BC)
Zhao Xing, King (115–112 BC)
Zhao Jiande, King (112–111 BC)

Asia: South

India

Maurya Empire (complete list) –
Devavarman, King (202–195 BC)
Shatadhanvan, King (195–187 BC) 
Brihadratha, King (187–180 BC)

Satavahana dynasty (Purana-based chronology) –
Krishna, King (205–187 BC)
Satakarni I, King (187–177 BC)
Purnotsanga, King (177–159 BC)
Skandhastambhi, King (159–141 BC)
Satakarni II, King (141–85 BC)

Shunga Empire (complete list) –
Pushyamitra Shunga, Emperor (185–149 BC)
Agnimitra, Emperor (149–141 BC)
Vasujyeshtha, Emperor (141–131 BC)
Vasumitra, Emperor (131–124 BC)
Bhagabhadra, Emperor (c.110 BC)

Sri Lanka
Anuradhapura Kingdom (complete list) –
Ellalan, King (205–161 BC)
Dutugamunu, King (161–137 BC)
Saddha Tissa, King (137–119 BC)
Thulatthana, King (119–119 BC)
Lanja Tissa, King (119–109 BC)
Khallata Naga, King (109–104 BC)
Valagamba, King (104–103, c.89–77 BC)
Pulahatta, King (103–100 BC)

Asia: West

Kingdom of Bithynia (complete list) –
Prusias I Cholus, King (228–182 BC)
Prusias II Cynegus, King (182–149 BC)
Nicomedes II Epiphanes, King (149–127 BC)
Nicomedes III Euergetes, King (127–94 BC)

Bosporan Kingdom (complete list) –
Hygiainon, King (c.220–c.200 BC)
Spartacus V, King (c.200–c.180 BC)
Pairisades III, King (c.180–c.150 BC)
Pairisades IV, King (c.150–c.125 BC)
Pairisades V, King (c.125–108 BC)

Kingdom of Cappadocia (complete list) –
Ariarathes IV, King (220–163 BC)
Ariarathes V, King (163–130 BC)
Orophernes, King (157 BC)
Ariarathes VI, King (130–116 BC)
Ariarathes VII, King (116–101 BC)
Ariarathes VIII, client King under Rome (101–96 BC)

Characene (complete list) –
Hyspaosines, King (c.127–124 BC)
Apodakos, King (c.110/09–104/03 BC)

Colchis (complete list) –
Saulaces, King (2nd century BC)

Kingdom of Commagene (complete list) –
Ptolemaeus, King (163–130 BC)
Sames II, King (130–109 BC)
Mithridates I, King (109–70 BC)

Elymais (complete list) –
Kamnaskires I Megas Soter, client King under Parthia (c.147–c.145 BC)
Kamnaskires II Nikephoros, client King under Parthia (c.145–c.139 BC)
Okkonapses, client King under Parthia (c.139/8 BC)
Tigraios, client King under Parthia (c.138/7–c.133/2 BC)
Darius, client King under Parthia (before c.129 BC)

Greco-Bactrian Kingdom (list) –
Euthydemus I, King (c.230–c.200 BC)
Demetrius I, King (c. 200–c. 180 BC)
Euthydemus II, King (c.180 BCE)
Antimachus I, King (c.185–170 BC)
Pantaleon, King (190s or 180s BC)
Agathocles, King (c.190–180 BC)
Demetrius II, King (155–150 BC)
Eucratides I, King (170–c.145 BC)
Plato, co-King (c.166 BC)
Eucratides II, King (145–140 BC)
Heliocles I, King (c.145–130 BC)

Indo-Greek Kingdom (complete list) –
Demetrius I, Greco-Bactrian King and Indo-Greek King (c.205–171 BC)
Pantaleon, King of Arachosia and Gandhara (c.190–185 BC)
Agathocles, King of Paropamisade (c.190–180 BC)
Antimachus I, Greco-Bactrian King (185–170 BC)
Apollodotus I, King of Paropamisade, Arachosia, Gandhara, and Punjab (c.180–160 BC)
Antimachus II, King of Paropamisadae, Arachosia, Gandhara, and Punjab (c.172–167 BC)
Demetrius II, King of Bactria (c.155–150 BC)
Menander I, King of Paropamisadae, Arachosia, Gandhara, and Punjab (155/150–130 BC)
Zoilos I, King of Paropamisade and Arachosia (c.130–120 BC)
Agathokleia, Regent, Queen of Gandhara and Punjab (c.130–125 BC)
Lysias, King of Paropamisade and Arachosia (120–110 BC)
Strato I, King of Gandhara and Punjab (125–110 BC)
Antialcidas, King of Paropamisade, Arachosia, and Gandhara (115–95 BC)
Heliokles II, King of Gandhara and Punjab (110–100 BC)
Polyxenios, King of Paropamisade and Arachosia (c.100 BC)
Demetrius III, King of Gandhara and Punjab (c.100 BC)
Philoxenus, King of Paropamisade, Arachosia, Gandhara, and Punjab (100–95 BC)

Judea: Hasmonean dynasty  (complete list) –
Judas Maccabeus, Leader of the Maccabees (167–160 BC)
Jonathan Apphus
Leader of the Maccabees (160–152 BC)
High Priest (152–143 BC)
Simon Thassi, High Priest (142–135 BC) and Prince (141–135 BC)
John Hyrcanus, High Priest and Prince (134–104 BC)
Aristobulus I, King and High Priest (104–103 BC)
Alexander Jannaeus, King and High Priest (103–76 BC)

Nabataea (complete list) –
Aretas I, King (c.169 BC)
Aretas II, King (120/110–96 BC)

Osroene (complete list) –
Aryu, King (132–127 BC)
Abdu, King (127–120 BC)
Fradhasht, King (120–115 BC)
Bakru I, King (115–112 BC)
Bakru II, King (112–94 BC)

Parthian Empire (complete list) –
Arsaces II, King (211–191 BC)
Phriapatius, King (191–176 BC)
Phraates I, King (176–171 BC)
Mithridates I, Great King, Shah (171–138 BC)
Phraates II, Great King, Shah (138–127 BC)
Artabanus II, Great King, Shah (127–124 BC)
Mithridates II, Great King, Shah (124–88 BC)

Kingdom of Pergamon: Attalid dynasty (complete list) –
Attalus I Soter (241–197 BC)
Eumenes II, King (197–159 BC)
Attalus II Philadelphus, King (160–138 BC)
Attalus III, King (138–133 BC)

Kingdom of Pontus (complete list) –
Mithridates III, King (c.210–c.190 BC)
Pharnaces I, King (c.190–c.155 BC)
Mithridates IV Philopator Philadephos, King (c.155–c.150 BC)
Mithridates V Euergetes, King (c.150–120 BC)
Mithridates VI, King (120–63 BC)

Seleucid Empire (complete list) –
Antiochus III, the Great, King (223–187 BC)
Seleucus IV Philopator, King (187–175 BC)
Antiochus IV Epiphanes, King (175–163 BC)
Antiochus V Eupator, King (163–161 BC)
Demetrius I Soter, King (161–150 BC)
Alexander I Balas, King (150–145 BC)
Antiochus VI Dionysus, King (145–142 BC)
Demetrius II Nicator, King (145–138, 129–126 BC)
Diodotus Tryphon, King (142–138 BC)
Antiochus VII Sidetes, King (138–129 BC)
Alexander II Zabinas, King (129–123 BC)
Seleucus V Philometor, King (126/125 BC)
Cleopatra Thea, Coregent (126–121 BC)
Antiochus VIII Grypus, King (125–96 BC)
Antiochus IX Cyzicenus, King (114–96 BC)

Europe

Europe: Balkans

Macedonia: Antigonid dynasty (complete list) –
Philip V, King (221–179 BC)
Perseus, King (179–168 BC)
Andriscus/ Pseudo-Philip VI, King (149–148 BC)

Odrysian kingdom of Thrace (complete list) –
Seuthes IV, King (215–190 BC)
Pleuratus I, King (213–208 BC) 
Amatokos III, King (184 BC)
Cotys IV, King (171–167 BC)
Teres III, King (c.149 BC)
Beithys, King (140–120 BC)
Cotys V, King (120–? BC)

Europe: East

Dacia (complete list) –
Rubobostes, King (2nd century BC)
Oroles, King (2nd century BC)

Europe: South
Roman Republic (complete list) –

Eurasia: Caucasus

Kingdom of Armenia (complete list) –
Orontes IV, King (c.212–200 BC)
Artaxias I, King (190/189–160/159 BC)
Tigranes I, King (159–123 BC)
Artavasdes I, King (123–95 BC)

Kingdom of Iberia (Kartli) (complete list) –
Sauromaces I, King (234–159 BC)
Mirian I, King (159–109 BC)
Pharnajom, King (109–90 BC)

References

State Leaders
-
2nd-century BC rulers